Zakour is a surname. Notable people with the surname include:

Abbas Zakour (born 1965), Israeli politician
Abdellah Zakour (1885–1972), Moroccan Berber military leader
Harry Zakour, Lebanese-born Ghanaian businessman and football administrator
John Zakour (born 1957), American writer